The giant wrymouth (Cryptacanthodes giganteus) is a species of wrymouth found in the northeastern Pacific Ocean from the Bering Sea to northern California where it is believed to spend most of its life buried in soft areas at the bottom of the ocean at depths of from .  This fish can reach a length of  TL. Like the wolf eel, giant wrymouths are easily mistaken for eels.

References

Cryptacanthodidae
Fish of the North Pacific
Western North American coastal fauna
Fish described in 1858
Taxa named by Heinrich von Kittlitz